Mourjou (Languedocien: Morjon, or Morjó) is a former commune in the Cantal department in south-central France. On 1 January 2019, it was merged into the new commune Puycapel. A chestnut fair is held annually during the third weekend of October.

The village is home to the Maison de la Chataigne, a museum dedicated to the chestnut: its history, its cultivation and harvesting, and its consumption. It is open from June to September every day of the week in the afternoon, except Monday.

Population

See also
Communes of the Cantal department

External links
Official website of the Commune of Mourjou
Foire de la Chataigne
Maison de la Chataigne
Auberge de Mourjou
Historical Information (in French)

References

Former communes of Cantal
Populated places disestablished in 2019